The 1898 Arkansas Industrial Cardinals football team represented the University of Arkansas during the 1898 college football season The team played two intercollegiate football games, both against . Arkansas won both games, the first by a 17–0 score and the second by a 12–6 score. The Cardinals concluded their season with a 36–8 loss against Fort Scott High School.

Schedule

References

Arkansas
Arkansas Razorbacks football seasons
Arkansas Industrial Cardinals football